Dholpur District is a district of Rajasthan state in Northern India. The town of Dholpur is the district headquarters. Dholpur District is a part of Bharatpur Divisional Commissionerate. It was carved out from the erstwhile Bharatpur District on 15 April 1982.

Dholpur District has an area of 3084 km². The Chambal River forms the southern boundary of the district, across which lies the state of Madhya Pradesh. The district is bounded by the state of Uttar Pradesh on the east and northeast, by Bharatpur District of Rajasthan on the northwest, and Karauli District of Rajasthan on the west. All along the bank of the Chambal River the district is deeply intersected by ravines; low ranges of hills in the western portion of the district supply quarries of fine-grained and easily worked red sandstone.

Administratively the district is divided into four subdivisions, Dholpur, Bari, Rajakhera, and Baseri, and six tehsils, Dholpur, Bari, Rajakhera, Basedi, Sarmathura and Saipau.

The economy of the district is primarily agricultural. The regional language of Dholpur is "Braj Bhasha," which has fragrances of Bundelkhandi and Khadi bhasha. It is because Dholpur is situated at the center surrounded by three states of Braj kshetra, are Rajasthan, Uttar Pradesh, and Madhya Pradesh.

It is  famous for Chambal Bharka (Sand made Mountains).

Dholpur District Information 
Dholpur is a district in the eastern part of Rajasthan, India. The district is surrounded by the states of Uttar Pradesh and Madhya Pradesh, and it has a population of approximately 1.2 million people. The district headquarters is the town of Dholpur, which is located about 260 kilometers from the state capital Jaipur. In this essay, we will discuss the history, geography, economy, and culture of Dholpur district.
History

The history of Dholpur dates back to the 6th century when it was part of the Matsya Kingdom. Later, it was ruled by several dynasties, including the Mauryas, Guptas, and Rajputs. In the 16th century, it came under the Mughal Empire and remained a part of it until the 18th century when it was taken over by the Marathas. The British also had a presence in Dholpur and it was part of the Rajputana Agency under British rule.

Geography

Dholpur is located in the eastern part of Rajasthan and covers an area of 3,034 square kilometers. The district is bounded by the Chambal River in the north, the state of Uttar Pradesh in the east, the districts of Bharatpur and Karauli in the west, and the district of Sawai Madhopur in the south. The terrain is mostly flat with some hills in the northern part of the district. The climate of Dholpur is tropical, with hot summers and mild winters. The average annual rainfall is about 660 mm.

Economy

Agriculture is the main source of income for the people of Dholpur district. The major crops grown in the district are wheat, barley, gram, and mustard. The district is also known for its production of guava fruit, which is grown on a large scale. The industries in the district are mainly agro-based and include cotton ginning and pressing, oil mills, and flour mills. The district also has a large number of small-scale industries, such as handloom weaving and pottery. The tourism industry is also growing in Dholpur, with many people visiting the district to see its historical and cultural sites.

Culture

Dholpur district has a rich cultural heritage. The people of Dholpur are predominantly Hindus and Muslims, and they celebrate many festivals throughout the year. The most important festival in the district is Holi, which is celebrated with great enthusiasm. Other festivals celebrated in Dholpur include Diwali, Eid, and Teej. The district is also known for its folk music and dance forms. The Ghoomar and Kalbeliya dance forms are popular in Dholpur, and they are performed during festivals and other cultural events.

Tourism

Dholpur district has many historical and cultural sites that attract tourists from all over the world. Some of the most popular tourist attractions in the district are:

 Machkund Temple: This ancient temple is dedicated to Lord Shiva and is located on the banks of the Chambal River. The temple is famous for its architectural beauty and is visited by thousands of tourists every year.
 Sher Shikar Gurudwara: This gurudwara is located near the Chambal River and is a popular pilgrimage site for Sikhs. It is believed that Guru Nanak Dev Ji stayed here during his travels.
 Van Vihar Wildlife Sanctuary: This wildlife sanctuary is home to a variety of flora and fauna, including tigers, leopards, and crocodiles. It is a popular destination for wildlife enthusiasts and nature lovers.
 Chambal Gardens: These beautiful gardens are located on the banks of the Chambal River and are a popular picnic spot

Demographics

According to the 2011 census Dholpur district has a population of 1,206,516, roughly equal to the nation of Bahrain or the US state of New Hampshire. This gives it a ranking of 394th in India (out of a total of 640). Its population growth rate over the decade 2001-2011 was  22.78%. Dhaulpur has a sex ratio of 845 females for every 1000 males, and a literacy rate of 70.14%. 20.51% of the population lives in urban areas. Scheduled Castes and Scheduled Tribes make up 20.36% and 4.86% of the population respectively.

At the time of the 2011 Census of India, 97.91% of the population in the district spoke Hindi and 1.58% Braj Bhasha as their first language.

References

External links

 Official website

 
Districts of Rajasthan
Districts in Bharatpur division